Eudoxus is a prominent lunar impact crater that lies to the east of the northern tip of the Montes Caucasus range. It is named after the Greek astronomer Eudoxus of Cnidus. It is located to the south of the prominent crater Aristoteles in the northern regions of the visible Moon. To the south is the ruined formation of Alexander, and the small crater Lamèch lies to the southwest.

The rim of Eudoxus has a series of terraces on the interior wall, and slightly worn ramparts about the exterior. It lacks a single central peak, but has a cluster of low hills about the midpoint of the floor. The remainder of the interior floor is relatively level.  Eudoxus has a ray system, and is consequently mapped as part of the Copernican System.

Satellite craters
By convention these features are identified on lunar maps by placing the letter on the side of the crater midpoint that is closest to Eudoxus.

References

 
 
 
 
 
 
 
 
 
 
 

Impact craters on the Moon